Chiva or CHIVA may refer to:

 CHIVA (charity), the Children's HIV Association, UK and Ireland
 Chiva, Armenia, a village in Armenia
 Chiva, Valencia, a municipality in Spain
 Chiva bus, a decorated Colombian rural bus
 CHIVA method, a type of surgery used to treat varicose veins
 Chiva River, a tributary of the Șipoaia River in Romania

See also
Chivas (disambiguation)